The Lima Metro is a rapid transit system that serves the area of the cities of Lima and Callao, both of which make up the Lima metropolitan area, currently linking the district of Villa El Salvador in the south of Lima with San Juan de Lurigancho in the northeast of the same city.

Despite the line having obtained 32 cars and completed construction of 7 stations for over many years, it did not operate a commercial service in 1990 during the first presidency of Alan García (1985–1990) because the constructed section did not have the distance or demand required to make it commercially viable. The construction of the Lima Metro remained paralyzed since that time under accusations of bribes, after an investment of 226 million dollars co-financed by the Italian Government.

Thus, the Peruvian Government under the second presidency of Alan García (2006–2011) put the Ministry of Transport and Communications in charge of completing Line 1, extending its current tracks up to Av. Line 1 finally opened for revenue service on July 11, 2011. The elevated viaduct of the Metro railway is the longest bridge in Latin America and was the longest in the world until it was surpassed by Wuhan Metro Line 1 in 2017.

History

Beginning 

Between 1972 and 1973, the "Metrolima" consortium elaborated the technical-economical feasibility studies and the pre-project of the "Mass Rapid Transit System for Passengers in the Metropolitan Area of Lima and Callao", approved by the Government of Peru in 1974. However, the political crisis generated by the sudden illness of President Juan Velasco Alvarado and the problem of his succession, added to the complexity of the Limean soil located in a highly seismic zone, as well as the international economic crisis of the time, made it impossible to get the necessary financing of US$317,000,000. This way, the "Metrolima" project, contemplating a total of 5 lines of underground train, was unable to be realized.

In 1986, the first presidency of Alan García created the "Autonomous Authority for the Mass Transit Electrical Transport System Special Project" with the Supreme Decree N° 001-86 MIPRE, with degree of Law N° 24565. This entity called for a public contest for the implementation of this system, won by the Italian-capital "Consorcio Tralima" consortium. It started promptly the infrastructure work for an elevated viaduct metro.

Construction started by placing the first stone on October 18, 1986, making its construction the main promise made in 1987 by the newly elected Mayor of Lima and member of the government party Jorge del Castillo.

The work began with a maintenance facility in the district of Villa El Salvador, south of the city, where the trains were meant to be stored and receive preventive maintenance. Construction advanced at a relatively fast pace, but when Line 1 reached the Atocongo Station the country was immersed in a deep economical and social crisis, which halted construction. It was meant to continue through Av. Aviación up to the Dos de Mayo Hospital in the city center, but the assigned budget had been already spent.

On April 28, 1990, three months before ending the first government by APRA, Alan García celebrated the opening of the line, despite the fact that the line was incomplete and did not reach areas of higher demand and density. The metro remained nearly useless in practice, given that the required investments for its operation and maintenance were unjustifiable for its ridership. In spite of that, the subsequent governments tried to revive the project because of the significant investment put into the trains and infrastructure. On several occasions, candidates in both presidential and municipal elections used it politically with the promise of finishing the project, although it never materialized.

The municipalities crossed by the metro started to cover the unfinished segments in an attempt to diminish the negative impact on the urban landscape. This way, the centre median of Av. Aviación had pillars with grass in order to avoid the invasion of ambulatory commerce (which represented a large problem in Lima at the time). Vegetation was planted in order to cover the uncovered pieces of steel and concrete of the unfinished project. Some districts also painted the columns and walls with images of Peruvian landscapes and nature, deeming the project as definitively cancelled.

On August 5, 2001, the AATE (Electrical Train Autonomous Authority) was passed on to the Metropolitan Municipality of Lima through the Urgency Decree N° 058–2001. Subsequently, the Lima Metro only made trips to give preventive maintenance to the trains.

The columns and rights-of-way of the train remained, for more than two decades, as a living example of the bad management of the first APRA government between 1985 and 1990. Several artistic and musical groups took advantage of the situation to satirize the project. The "El Tren Eléctrico" song by Juan Luis Dammert and the imaginary launch campaign denominated "Lima 2427" (calculated finishing year given the progress rate the project had thus far), launched by artist Camila Bustamante. This campaign placed stickers in the supposed future stations and gave out informative flyers on the streets, allowing the general public to find out that the project didn't have just one line but seven interconnected lines servicing the whole city.

Present 

The central government decided in 2009 that the Ministry of Transport and Communications (MTC) retook the administration of the AATE (Electrical Train Autonomous Authority), putting a dependency called Provias Nacional in charge of organizing a public international licitation to select the consortium in charge of the civil works for the remaining section of the train and its electromechanical equipment. Financing would come from a foreign debt operation with the Development Bank of Latin America (CAF) for US$300 million. This credit was approved on August 18, 2009.

On December 2, 2009, the Ministry gave way for the construction to the "Consorcio Tren Eléctrico Lima" consortium, formed by Odebrecht (Brazil) and Graña y Montero (Peru). The project, according to contract, will be delivered on July 5, 2011, barely days before the second presidency of Alan García ends, thus justifying the need to work in six fronts simultaneously (Angamos, San Borja Sur, Javier Prado, Nicolás Arriola and Grau). Construction started On March 2, 2010, and, as of February 2011, the project is complete except for electrification and rebuilding of the current Italian trains.

In parallel, the Ministry of Transports and Communications (MTC) is organizing a new public contest with the Private Investment Promotion Agency (Proinversión) to select the train operator. Whoever wins the contest shall be provided with the remaining rolling stock, consisting of the acquisition of an additional 7 trains (48 cars) to complement what already exists. The operator will also be in charge of operating the metro for 30 years. In the same way, the Ministry of Transports and Communications (MTC) will start another international public licitation process for the construction of the second phase of Line 1, connecting the Intermodal Grau station with the district of San Juan de Lurigancho, passing through Av. Próceres de la Independencia all the way to Bayóvar. This way, the northeast and south parts of the city will be connected through  railway, completing the first line of the Lima Metro system, the elevated viaduct, at the time was the longest in the world.

On December 23, 2010, president Alan Garcia established through supreme decree 059-2010-MTC the Basic Metro Network of Lima and Callao, signaling the implementation of a network consisting of 5 lines of metro for Lima, contemplating the construction of ground, elevated and underground segments.

On July 11, 2011, President Alan Garcia inaugurated Line 1 of the Lima Metro, in its second phase from Villa el Salvador to Downtown Lima.

On May 13, 2013, Ministry of Transport and Communications (MTC) said that the government also awarded concessions of lines 3 and 4 of the Lima Metro, by July 2016, of the five lines that have this public transport system.

Line 1 

It starts its path in the Industrial Park of Villa El Salvador, south of the city, continuing on to Av. Pachacútec in Villa María del Triunfo and then to Av. Los Héroes in San Juan de Miraflores. Afterwards, it continues through Av. Tomás Marsano in Surco to reach Ov. Los Cabitos and then on to Av. Aviación to finish in Av. Grau in the city center.

Currently, Line 1 has a fleet of trains from the 1980s by AnsaldoBreda, put in service through the 16 stations. This fleet includes an additional 42 trains in order to be able to service with the adequate frequencies, contemplating 26 stations in total, the integral remodeling of the current stations and the revamping of wagons, including the installation of air conditioning among other facilities and 19 new Alstom trains similar to the 9000 Series on the Barcelona Metro. Left-hand running is used on this line, unlike the most metro systems in South America.
 

Line 1 extension 

New lines

Line 2 

On February 15, 2012, at the conclusion of discussions between the Central Government and the Municipalities of Lima and Callao, President Ollanta Humala announced the upcoming construction of Metro Line 2 of Lima along the initially proposed route, with some variations, as a 27 km underground line, linking the district of Ate (Lima) and the Callao region adjoining the capital.

Concurrently, the project include a first stage of line 4 this will connect the system to the International Airport and four stations beyond.

Transport Minister Carlos Paredes meanwhile projected that the underground work will take a maximum of six years. "We calculated that technical studies will take about two years and construction about three years.  This means that the lines will begin operations in five or six years," said Paredes in 2012.

An international consortium won the bidding for this project; construction started in September 2014, with the first section due to be operational in 2020 and the full line in 2024. The opening was delayed to 2022.

Line 3 
On March 21, 2012, Lima's mayor Susana Villaran presented a feasibility study of an underground metro line that follows in large parts the route of Line 3 as originally planned by the central government. The study was done in 2009 for the municipality of Lima, with support from the French government.

According to the mayor's statements, these studies will be under consideration by the Ministry of Transport and Communication, and construction of this line will take only four years. The line will be underground from north to south, serving 
a section of the city with high ridership potential. This line is described as a "high speed" line, based on the distances between stations.

On May 13, 2013, the Ministry of Transport and Communications (MTC) said that the government had also awarded concessions for the construction of lines 3 and 4 by July 2016, out of the five lines that constitute the system.

Line 4 
On May 9, 2012, the director of the Private Investment Promotion Agency (Proinversión), Hector Rene Rodriguez, announced that the MTC (Ministry of Transport and Communication) would construct Lines 2 and 4 simultaneously. Line 4 will follow an east–west route connecting the district of La Molina with Jorge Chavez International Airport.

This line has a stage to be developed as a part of the concession of line 2, which is already under construction, is an 8 km section that will link line 2 with Jorge Chávez International Airport, this section should be operational in 2019.

On May 13, 2013, the Ministry of Transport and Communications (MTC) said that the government had also awarded concessions for the construction of lines 3 and 4 by July 2016, out of the five lines that constitute the system. The opening was in 2020 estimated to happen in 2022.

Line 5 
Metro Line 5 will connect the districts in the south of the city, like Miraflores, Barranco and Chorrillos; with a final station next to the south Panamerican highway Villa toll. By now it is planned but there is no studies of design nor construction yet.

Line 6 
Metro Line 6 has been presented in 2014 as a private initiative and is under evaluation. These studies will determine technical aspects regarding whether Line 6 will be underground, aerial or both. The line has a length of 32 km extending, from the Naranjal Station of BRT system Metropolitano through Av. Tupac Amaru, Los Alisos Avenue, Universitaria Avenue, Bertolotto Avenue, Perez Aranibar Avenue and Angamos-Primavera Avenue.

Network map

See also
 Transport in Lima
 El Metropolitano
List of longest bridges
 List of metro systems
 List of rapid transit systems
 List of Latin American rail transit systems
Line 1, Wuhan Metro
Rio–Niterói Bridge

References

External links

 Línea 1 del Metro de Lima 
 Consorcio Metro de Lima 
 Autoridad Autónoma del Sistema Eléctrico de Transporte Masivo de Lima y Callao (AATE) 
 Agencia de Promoción de la Inversión Privada 
 Urban Rail - Lima Metro

 
Railway lines opened in 2011
Emepa Group
Electric railways